Nad's is an Australian trademark of internationally sold hair waxing removal products. The name is also used for chemical depilatory, skin-care, and other products.

Background and history
Nad's was developed and founded in 1992 by Australian businesswoman Sue Ismiel. The original product was a tub of natural, green-colored gel consisting of honey, molasses, sugar, and lemon juice. Inspiration for the product came from her daughter's desire to remove the hair from her arms. Ismiel improved a concept used by her mother and grandmother in order to reduce the pain of the waxing process on her daughter. The product took twelve months to develop. Ismiel notified her colleagues of the result, to which they responded by encouraging her to bring the product to her workplace to remove unwanted hair from their eyebrows and upper lips.

The process of developing the gel was completed in a large pot, later to be undertaken in Ismiel's garage which she made into a factory. She received her own stall at a market in Flemington, New South Wales, and soon got stalls in local shopping centers throughout Australia. The product's commercial success came from an investment in a television advertising campaign, which led to a call center being developed to take orders of the product.

Laser clinics
Nad's has six laser hair removal clinics located throughout Sydney. You by Sia acquired all six Nad's Laser Clinics on July 6, 2015.

Commercial reception
In 1997, Ismiel received a check from Woolworths for $1 million. Five years following its release, British newspaper The Guardian revealed that Nad's was the best-selling personal care product in Australia with a turnover of $7 million. The Sydney Morning Herald named it as Australia's best-known hair remover.

References

External links
Nad's Company Website

Australian companies established in 1992
Hair removal
Personal care brands
Products introduced in 1992